Parola Tank Museum, officially Armoured Vehicle Museum (Finnish Panssarimuseo) is a military museum located 110 kilometres north of Helsinki in Parola, near Hämeenlinna, Finland, a few kilometres from the Finnish Army Armoured Brigade training unit. It displays various tanks, armoured vehicles and anti-tank guns used by the Finnish Defence Forces throughout their history, including their latest Leopard 2A4 tank.  A rare exhibit is an armoured train used in World War II. The museum was opened on June 18, 1961, when there were 19 tanks and 12 anti-tank guns on display.

Full list of vehicles  

 Renault FT-17
 Vickers-Carden-Loyd
 Vickers 6-ton
 T-26
 T-28
 T-50
 T-60
 T-70
 BT-42
 T-34 
 T-34-85 
 JSU-152
 KV-1 
 KV-1E

 BA-20M
 BA-10
 T-20 Komsomolets
 T-54 
 T-55M
 T-72M1
 ZSU-57-2
 BTR-50
 BTR-60
 BTR-80
 BMP-1
 PT-76
 Leopard 2A4
 StuG III Ausf. G

 Panzerkampfwagen IV 
 FAMO
 Daimler Ferret
 Sisu armoured car
 Humber "Pig" 
 M2 White
 Landsverk Anti II
 M4 Sherman
 Patria AMV
 Patria AMV AMOS
 MT-LB
 Charioteer
 Comet
 Armoured train

Light tanks

Medium tanks

Heavy tanks

Special tanks
ZSU-57-2 anti-aircraft gun

Assault guns

Armoured cars

Infantry fighting vehicles

Modern vehicles

See also
The Artillery Museum of Finland
Military Museum of Finland

References

Military and war museums in Finland
Museums established in 1961
Hattula
Tank museums
Museums in Kanta-Häme